A fjord (or fiord) a long, narrow inlet with steep sides or cliffs, created by a glacier.

Fjord may also refer to:

Fjord City, an urban renewal project for the waterfront of Oslo, Norway
Fjord horse, a Norwegian horse breed 
Fjord Line, a Norwegian ferry operator
Fjords (board game), a tile-based German-style board game
Fjord Stone, a half-orc warlock player character in the web series Critical Role
Fjord (municipality), a village in Norway
Fjord-lake, a lake in Russia named after fjords (aka Lake Fiordovoye)

See also

Fiordland (disambiguation)
Fjard, an inlet with a shallower profile than a fjord
Fjord1, a Norwegian transport conglomerate
Fjordgård, a village Troms county, Norway
Fjordland, a Norwegian food manufacturer